The Pagemaster is a platform game released in conjunction with the 1994 film The Pagemaster for the Super Nintendo Entertainment System, Game Boy, and Sega Genesis. Richard Tyler can be guided through a selection of literature genre-themed levels, ranging from horror to adventure and fantasy worlds. Magic can be used, and stomping enemies to death by jumping on their heads is permitted. Enemies include bats, flying books, giant hands, ghosts, pirates, and more.

Reception 

GamePro gave the SNES version a mixed review. They criticized the poor controls and repetitiveness, commenting that "Almost all of Pagemaster is redundant platform jumping against the same enemies who appear over and over again." However, they praised the graphics for their colorful and effective recreations of the settings for famous novels and concluded the game "isn't bad, it just isn't as fun as it could've been." The four reviewers of Electronic Gaming Monthly also considered it a just above average game. They praised the movie-like graphics and audio, but criticized the controls, saying the character tends to slide around, and felt the game to be generally uninteresting. They held the Genesis version in lower regard, commenting that "This game would be enjoyable, but the control just isn't there." GamePro similarly commented that the Genesis version is good in most respects, but that the poor controls make it an overall mediocre game.

Reviewing the Game Boy version, GamePro praised the diverse gameplay, detailed graphics, and atmospheric music, but remarked that the poor control ruins the entire experience. They particularly cited jumps requiring excessive precision and slippery control, remarking that "Richard slides from platforms so often you'll think his soles are oiled."

Sales
The game shipped more than 100,000 copies.

Notes

References

External links 
 
 GiantBomb

1994 video games
Game Boy games
Sega Genesis games
Super Nintendo Entertainment System games
Fox Interactive games
Video games based on films
20th Century Studios video games
Video games developed in the United Kingdom